Michael O'Keefe (born Raymond Peter O'Keefe, Jr.; April 24, 1955) is an American actor, known for his roles as Danny Noonan in Caddyshack, Ben Meechum in The Great Santini, for which he received a nomination for the Academy Award for Best Supporting Actor, and Darryl Palmer in the Neil Simon movie The Slugger's Wife. He also appeared as Fred on the television sitcom Roseanne from 1993 to 1995.

Early life, family and education
Raymond Peter O'Keefe Jr. was born in Mount Vernon, New York, the oldest of seven children in an Irish American family. He is the son of Stephanie (née Fitzpatrick) and Raymond Peter O'Keefe, who was a law professor at Fordham University and who also taught at St. Thomas University. O'Keefe was raised in Larchmont, New York.

He graduated from Mamaroneck High School. He attended the American Academy of Dramatic Arts and New York University. He holds an MFA in creative writing from Bennington College.

Career
O'Keefe is known for his role as Danny Noonan in the comedy film Caddyshack. He received a Best Supporting Actor Oscar nomination for his role as Ben, the oldest son of a Marine aviator in The Great Santini (1979) starring Robert Duvall, who was also nominated for an Academy Award for the film. He played a Marine in the CBS miniseries A Rumor of War (1980) as the friend of Brad Davis' character, Philip Caputo. 

O’Keefe played the lead role in the 1982 film Split Image as a college athlete who is lured into a religious cult by a beautiful girl (Karen Allen). He appeared in the Neil Simon movie The Slugger's Wife (1985) as Darryl Palmer, a baseball player for the Atlanta Braves who enjoys the fame and fringe benefits of bachelor life until he meets rock singer Debby Huston, falls in love, and decides to settle down.

He appeared in the thriller film The Glass House and starred with Tommy Lee Jones in the 1983 pirate adventure Nate and Hayes. O'Keefe appeared with George Clooney in Michael Clayton. He has appeared twice with Jack Nicholson, as his son in Ironweed and as the father of a murdered girl in The Pledge. He appeared in the film Frozen River. He  played the district attorney Calvin Beckett in the film American Violet.

O'Keefe's Broadway theatre credits include Side Man (1998), Mass Appeal (1981), Fifth of July (1980), and Reckless with Mary-Louise Parker (2004). He starred in the play A Few Good Men in 1992 with a national tour as Lt. Jg. Daniel Kaffee.

O'Keefe's highest-profile television role was as Fred, the husband of Jackie Harris (Laurie Metcalf) on the ABC series Roseanne from 1993 to 1995. He played the husband in the series Life's Work from 1996 to 1997. Additional television credits include the lead role of Simon MacHeath in the short-lived Boston-based series Against the Law, which aired on Fox during the 1990–91 season, and the role of Ron Steffey in the 1992 CBS drama Middle Ages.

O'Keefe has guest-starred on Saving Grace, The West Wing, Criminal Minds, The Closer, Law & Order, Law & Order: Special Victims Unit, Law & Order: Criminal Intent, House, M*A*S*H, Ghost Whisperer, Brothers and Sisters, Leverage, Blue Bloods and The Waltons. In 2014, he appeared in a recurring role in Homeland as CIA agent and former interim station chief John Redmond  and as Detective Winslow in the Amazon Prime original TV series Sneaky Pete.

Personal life
O'Keefe was married to rock/blues singer Bonnie Raitt from April 27, 1991, to November 1999, when they divorced.

He married actress Emily Donahoe in 2011, with whom he has a son.

He has been a practicing Zen Buddhist since 1981.

Filmography

Film
Sources: Hollywood.com TCM

Television
Sources: Hollywood.com TCM

Awards and nominations 
Academy Award
 1981: Nominated, "Best Actor in a Supporting Role" – The Great Santini

CableACE Award
 1987: Nominated, "Best Actor in a Dramatic Series" – The Hitchhiker

Golden Globe Award
 1981: Nominated, "New Male Star of the Year in a Motion Picture" – The Great Santini

References

External links
 
 
 
 

1955 births
Living people
American male film actors
American male stage actors  
American male television actors
American Zen Buddhists
American people of Irish descent
Male actors from New York (state)
Bonnie Raitt
20th-century American male actors
21st-century American male actors
American Academy of Dramatic Arts alumni
New York University alumni
Bennington College alumni
People from Larchmont, New York
Actors from Mount Vernon, New York
Former Roman Catholics
Mamaroneck High School alumni